This is a list of mosques in Algeria. According to the Ministry of Religious Affairs and Endowment in 2006, there are around 15,000 mosques in Algeria as a whole, of which 450 are in the capital city of Algiers. 90% of which are built after the independence of Algeria in 1962.

See also
Islam in Algeria
Zawiyas in Algeria

References 

Algeria
 
Mosques